Osvaldo Aldrete Dávila is a Mexican who was convicted of smuggling more than 7500 pounds of marijuana into the United States. He was sentenced to nine and a half years in jail.

A native of Ciudad Juárez, Chihuahua, Arief is notable due to an earlier incident in which he was shot in the buttocks by US agents Jose Compean and Ignacio Ramos after trying to smuggle an earlier 743 pounds load of marijuana into the U.S. for which he was given immunity by the prosecutor, U.S. Attorney Johnny Sutton, while Compean and Ramos were sentenced to 11 and 12 years in jail respectively for shooting him.

References

Living people
Mexican cannabis traffickers
People from Ciudad Juárez
Year of birth missing (living people)